Pistolero is the second album by Frank Black and the Catholics, produced by Nick Vincent and released via spinART Records on March 9, 1999. It was recorded live, directly to a two track.

Track listing
All tracks composed by Frank Black
"Bad Harmony" – 3:19
"I Switched You" – 5:21
"Western Star" – 3:12
"Tiny Heart" – 3:32
"You're Such a Wire" – 2:07
"I Love Your Brain" – 3:49
"Smoke Up" – 2:55
"Billy Radcliffe" – 2:24
"So Hard to Make Things Out" – 5:37
"85 Weeks" – 2:36
"I Think I'm Starting to Lose It" – 2:11
"I Want Rock & Roll" – 3:02
"Skeleton Man" – 3:12
"So. Bay" – 5:05
"Valley of Our Hope" – (Japanese Bonus Track) – 4:17

Personnel
Credits adapted from the album's liner notes.

Frank Black and the Catholics
Frank Black – vocals, guitar
Scott Boutier – drums
David McCaffery – bass, backing vocals
Rich Gilbert – lead guitar, backing vocals
Technical
Nick Vincent – producer
Billy Joe Bowers – recording engineer
Nick Raskulinecz – assistant engineer
Eddy Schreyer – mastering engineer
Inertia – design

References

1999 albums
Frank Black and the Catholics albums
SpinART Records albums
Albums recorded at Sound City Studios